Selby's Secret is the first children's novel in the Selby series by Australian writer Duncan Ball, and was first published in 1985. It was reissued in 2004.

Plot summary
Selby is the only talking dog in Australia – perhaps in the world. He longs to chat with his owners but fears loses his status as their beloved pet. Keeping his secret is not easy.

Awards and nominations
Years after publication, the book won its first award, the 1987 Primary section in the Waybra Award. It also came fourth place in the 1987  Primary section of the Koala Awards. The book was also shortlisted many other awards including the  1993 Yabba Awards for young readers. It has been shortlisted for the Koala Awards for 1988-1991 as well as 1996, 1999, and 2000. In 2001 it was finally voted into the Koala Awards’ Hall of Fame.

Notes

Selby Series
1985 Australian novels
1985 children's books
Australian children's novels
Children's fantasy novels
Children's novels about animals
Talking animals in fiction